Vestøl is a village in Gjerstad municipality in Agder county, Norway. There is only one road leading to Vestøl, known as the Vestølveien road which starts at Rød and runs past the Åsbø farm area.

References

Villages in Agder
Gjerstad